Rubén Ramírez Hidalgo was the defending champion, but chose not to compete.
Alessio di Mauro defeated Daniel Kosakowski 4–6, 6–3, 6–2 in the final to win the title.

Seeds

Draw

Finals

Top half

Bottom half

References
 Main Draw
 Qualifying Draw

San Luis Open Challenger - Singles
2013 Singles